Finn Wirlmann (born 18 July 1996) is a German footballer who plays as a midfielder for Weiche Flensburg.

Career
Wirlmann made his professional debut for Holstein Kiel in the 3. Liga on 9 August 2014, coming on as a substitute in the 76th minute for Manuel Hartmann in the 1–0 away loss against VfB Stuttgart II. For the 2016–17 season, he was loaned by Kiel to ETSV Weiche in the Regionalliga Nord. Following the season, he joined the club (then renamed to SC Weiche Flensburg 08) on a permanent basis.

References

External links
 
 

1996 births
Living people
German footballers
Association football midfielders
Holstein Kiel players
Holstein Kiel II players
SC Weiche Flensburg 08 players
3. Liga players
Regionalliga players